Maulen Mamyrov (Маулен Мамыров; born December 14, 1970) is a Kazakhstani wrestler. At the 1996 Summer Olympics he won the bronze medal in the Men's Freestyle Flyweight (48–52 kg) category.

Achievements
1993 Asian Championship: 52.0 kg Freestyle (4th)
1994 Asian Games: 52.0 kg Freestyle (1st)
1995 Asian Championship: 57.0 kg Freestyle (5th)
1995 World Championship: 52.0 kg Freestyle (12th)
1996 Asian Championship: 52.0 kg Freestyle (4th)
1997 World Championship: 54.0 kg Freestyle (3rd)
1998 World Championship: 54.0 kg Freestyle (11th)
1998 Asian Games: 54.0 kg Freestyle (3rd)
1999 World Championship: 54.0 kg Freestyle (7th)
1999 Asian Championship: 54.0 kg Freestyle (1st)
2001 World Championship: 54.0 kg Freestyle (4th)
2002 Asian Games: 55.0 kg Freestyle (4th)

External links
 

1970 births
Living people
Wrestlers at the 1996 Summer Olympics
Wrestlers at the 2000 Summer Olympics
Kazakhstani male sport wrestlers
Olympic bronze medalists for Kazakhstan
Olympic wrestlers of Kazakhstan
Olympic medalists in wrestling
Asian Games medalists in wrestling
Wrestlers at the 1994 Asian Games
Wrestlers at the 1998 Asian Games
Wrestlers at the 2002 Asian Games
Medalists at the 1996 Summer Olympics
Medalists at the 1994 Asian Games
Medalists at the 1998 Asian Games
Asian Games gold medalists for Kazakhstan
Asian Games bronze medalists for Kazakhstan
21st-century Kazakhstani people
20th-century Kazakhstani people